Ben or Benjamin Stevens may refer to:

Ben Stevens (1959–2022), American politician
Ben Stevens (cricketer) (born 1992), Jersey cricketer
Benjamin Franklin Stevens (1833–1902), American bibliographer

See also
Ben Stephens (disambiguation)
Ben Strevens (born 1980), English footballer
Stevens (surname)